Justin Warren Marshall  (born 5 August 1973) is a New Zealand former rugby union player. He played 81 games for the New Zealand All Blacks between 1995 and 2005.

He subsequently moved to Europe and had spells playing for Leeds Tykes, the Ospreys, Montpellier and Saracens.

He is now a Sky Sports commentator in New Zealand for most All Blacks games and other provincial matches.

Early life
He was born in Gore on 5 August 1973 and educated at Gore High School, before settling in Christchurch where he played for the High School Old Boys club.

Playing career
Marshall began his rugby union career with Southland and was then asked to join Christchurch by Canterbury coach Vance Stewart. It was whilst here that Marshall first made the break into the All Blacks side for the 1995 tour of Italy and France. Marshall was just 22 when he made his début against  in a 37–12 win.

In 1997 Marshall was made captain of New Zealand and led out his team in four tests in Great Britain and Ireland, becoming the All Blacks' 54th test captain. In moving to Europe, Marshall retired from international rugby with the All Blacks in 2005. He made 81 appearances for the All Blacks, with a record of 61 wins, 1 draw and just 19 defeats. Marshall is the second, behind Aaron Smith, highest capped scrum half in All Blacks history. He has scored a record 24 test tries for New Zealand, a tally that more than doubles the next best for an All Blacks scrum half, held by Sid Going.

Marshall played for Canterbury in the National Provincial Championship, the Crusaders in the Super 12 competition.

His New Zealand contract ran out after the 2005 Lions tour, and he signed to play the 2005–06 season for Leeds Tykes in the English Premiership. Following the relegation of Leeds from the Premiership, Marshall left the club at the end of the season. On 25 April 2006 it was announced he had signed for the Welsh regional side Ospreys on a two-year contract beginning in September 2006. Before signing for Ospreys, Marshall indicated an interest in returning to New Zealand to once again be an All Black and play in the World Cup, even being prepared to play for Auckland. On 16 July 2008 Ospreys announced that Marshall had been released from his contract early, and he signed for Top 14 side Montpellier. On 15 January 2009 he signed for Saracens on a contract to the end of the 2008–09 season.

Throughout the 2009–10 season, whilst continuing to play for Saracens, Marshall was a pundit and commentator on BBC Wales rugby programme Scrum V. At the end of that season, he announced the end of his playing career with a view to moving back to New Zealand to focus on his broadcasting career there.

In April 2013, Marshall made an unexpected comeback, taking the field for club side Wakatipu, at the age of 39.

Commentating career
Marshall joined Sky TV New Zealand in 2010.

First-class record

Awards and achievements

Individual
In the 2005 Queen's Birthday Honours, Marshall was appointed a Member of the New Zealand Order of Merit, for services to rugby.

Team
Club and domestic
1994 New Zealand National Provincial Championship Division II Champions
1994–1995 Ranfurly Shield holders
1997 New Zealand National Provincial Championship Division I Champions
1998 Super 12 champions
1999 Super 12 champions
2000 Super 12 champions
2000–2003 Ranfurly Shield holders
2001 New Zealand National Provincial Championship Division I Champions
2002 Super 12 champions
2004 Ranfurly Shield holders
2004 New Zealand National Provincial Championship Division I Champions
2005 Super 12 champions
2006–07 Celtic League champions
2007–08 EDF Energy (Anglo-Welsh) Cup champions

International
1996 Bledisloe Cup champions
1996 Tri Nations champions
1996 New Zealand tour of South Africa series winner
1997 Bledisloe Cup champions
1997 Tri-Nations champions
1999 Tri-Nations champions
1999 Rugby World Cup fourth place
2002 Tri-Nations champions
2003 Bledisloe Cup champions
2003 Tri-Nations champions
2003 Rugby World Cup third place (bronze)
2004 Bledisloe Cup champions
2005 British & Irish Lions tour of New Zealand series winner

See also
High School Old Boys RFC

References

Bibliography
Gillies, Angus, Justin Marshall, (New Zealand, 2005)

External links
 

1973 births
Living people
New Zealand international rugby union players
Members of the New Zealand Order of Merit
New Zealand rugby union players
Canterbury rugby union players
Crusaders (rugby union) players
Southland rugby union players
Barbarian F.C. players
Leeds Tykes players
Montpellier Hérault Rugby players
Ospreys (rugby union) players
Rugby union scrum-halves
People from Mataura
People educated at Gore High School
New Zealand expatriate rugby union players
New Zealand expatriate sportspeople in England
New Zealand expatriate sportspeople in France
New Zealand expatriate sportspeople in Wales
Expatriate rugby union players in England
Expatriate rugby union players in Wales
Expatriate rugby union players in France
Saracens F.C. players
Rugby union players from Southland, New Zealand